Ahmed Hussain Shah is a Pakistani politician who had been a member of the Provincial Assembly of Khyber Pakhtunkhwa from March 2019 till January 2023.

Political career
Shah started his political career with Pakistan Peoples Party. His father Muzammil Shah was also a senior politician and was a close aide to PPP founder Zulfikar Ali Bhutto. He first won provincial assembly seat in 2008 general elections and remained Provincial Minister for Industry and Commerce in Awami National Party's coalition government. He lost next two general elections consecutively. He then joined Pakistan Tehreek-e-Insaf after the disqualification of Pakistan Muslim League (N) elect Mian Zia ur Rehman

Shah contested by-election on 26 February 2019 from constituency PK-30 (Mansehra-I) of Provincial Assembly of Khyber Pakhtunkhwa on the ticket of Pakistan Tehreek-e-Insaf. He won the election by the majority of 6,493 votes over the runner up Mazhar Qasim of Pakistan Muslim League (N). He garnered 46,438 votes while Qasim received 39,945 votes.

References

Living people
Pakistan Tehreek-e-Insaf politicians
Politicians from Khyber Pakhtunkhwa
Year of birth missing (living people)